Long Beach is a city located in Harrison County, Mississippi, United States. It is part of the  Gulfport-Biloxi metropolitan area. As of the 2020 census, the city had a population of 15,829.

Geography 

Demographics

2020 census

As of the 2020 United States census, 16,780 people, 6,545 households, and 4,243 families were residing in the city.

2000 census
As of the census of 2000, 17,320 people, 6,560 households, and 4,696 families resided in the city. The population density was 1,713.6 people per square mile (661.5/km). The 7,203 housing units had an average density of 712.6 per square mile (275.1/km). The racial makeup of the city was 87.49% White, 7.36% African American, 0.39% Native American, 2.57% Asian, 0.75% from other races, and 1.44% from two or more races. About 2.29% of the population were Hispanics or Latinos of any race.

Of the 6,560 households, 36.2% had children under 18 living with them, 53.8% were married couples living together, 13.5% had a female householder with no husband present, and 28.4% were not families. About 22.9% of all households were made up of individuals, and 7.7% had someone living alone who was 65  or older. The average household size was 2.61, and the average family size was 3.07.

In the city, the age distribution was 27.1% under 18, 9.1% from 18 to 24, 29.8% from 25 to 44, 22.8% from 45 to 64, and 11.2% who were 65 or older. The median age was 36 years. For every 100 females, there were 93.1 males. For every 100 females 18 and over, there were 89.7 males. The median income for a household in the city was $43,289, and for a family was $50,014. Males had a median income of $35,909 versus $24,119 for females. The per capita income for the city was $19,305. 9.0% of the population and 7.7% of families were below the poverty line. About 15.2% of those under 18 and 3.7% of those 65 and older were living below the poverty line.

Education 
The city of Long Beach is served by the Long Beach School District, which operates five campuses and has an enrollment around 2,700 students. These campuses are Long Beach High School, Long Beach Middle School, Reeves Elementary School, Quarles Elementary School, and Harper McCaughan Elementary School, rebuilt in a new location after the previous school was destroyed by Hurricane Katrina.

The University of Southern Mississippi's Gulf Coast campus is located in Long Beach on East Beach Boulevard. The Friendship Oak tree is located on the front lawn of the Southern Miss Gulf Park campus.

History

The early 1900s
Long Beach began as an agricultural town, based around its radish industry, but on August 10, 1905, Long Beach incorporated and became another city on the Mississippi Gulf Coast.  As the years went on, the city moved from its agricultural heritage and moved toward tourism with the beach becoming increasingly popular.

"The Radish Capital of the World" 
Long Beach's early economy was based largely upon radishes.  Logging initially drove the local economy, but when the area's virgin yellow pine forests became depleted, row crops were planted on the newly cleared land.

A productive truck farming town in the early 20th century, citizens of Long Beach proclaimed the city to be the "Radish Capital of the World".  The city was especially known for its cultivation of the Long Red radish variety, a favorite beer hall staple in the northern US at the time.  In 1921, a bumper crop resulted in the shipment of over 300 trainloads of Long Beach's Long Red radishes to northern states.

Eventually, the Long Red radishes for which Long Beach was known fell into disfavor, and the rise of the common button radish caused a dramatic decline in the cultivation of this crop in the area.

Hurricane Katrina 

Hurricane Katrina struck the city on August 29, 2005, destroying almost all buildings within  of the Gulf of Mexico shoreline.  Many Long Beach residents were left homeless or living in water- and or wind-damaged houses. At least one person was confirmed dead.

The city of Long Beach, California, held a fund raiser to help its eponymous relative.  The city of Peoria, Arizona, adopted Long Beach and provided both public and private resources.  This resulted in a close relationship between the two communities.

Today 

Today, the city is still recovering from Hurricane Katrina.  Residents are returning as beaches and condominiums in the area are being repaired, but the city has not seen a return of business to pre-Katrina levels due in part to building codes on the beach established by the Federal Emergency Management Agency and Mississippi Emergency Management Agency and to the economic downturn.

Notable people
 Richard Bennett, member of the Mississippi House of Representatives
 Hale Boggs, former member of the U.S. House of Representatives and House majority leader and a member of the Warren Commission
 Ted N. Branch, retired vice admiral in the United States Navy and former Director of Naval Intelligence
 Myles Brennan, quarterback for the LSU Tigers
 Richie Brown, NFL player
 Nick James, former professional defensive tackle
 Shea Kerry, writer/producer
 Gerald McRaney, film and televisin actor

References

External links

 City of Long Beach official website

Cities in Mississippi
Cities in Harrison County, Mississippi
Gulfport–Biloxi metropolitan area
Populated coastal places in Mississippi